The West Indies cricket team toured Ireland in September 2017 to play a One Day International (ODI) match. It was Ireland's first scheduled ODI match since they became a Full Member side in June 2017. The teams last faced each other when they met in the group stage of the 2015 Cricket World Cup. However, the match was called-off without a ball bowled due to rain and a wet outfield. As a result, the West Indies needed to remain undefeated when they played five ODIs against England later in September to avoid the 2018 Cricket World Cup Qualifier; they were unsuccessful, and therefore failed to directly qualify for the 2019 Cricket World Cup.

Squads

ODI series

Only ODI

References

External links
 Series home at ESPN Cricinfo

2017 in Irish cricket
2017 in West Indian cricket
International cricket competitions in 2017
West Indian cricket tours of Ireland